Zhao Mo was the grandson and successor of Zhao Tuo, and the second ruler of Nanyue, a kingdom encompassing parts of modern-day southern China and northern Vietnam. His rule began in 137 BC and ended with his death in 124 BC.

Name
Records from this period were written in classical Chinese and are transliterated, typically into either pinyin (romanized Chinese) or into alphabetical Vietnamese. The name 趙 眜 transliterates as Zhao Mo in pinyin, but as Triệu Mạt in Vietnamese. Zhao/Triệu is a family name, so Zhao Mo's dynasty is referred to as the Triệu dynasty in Vietnam. His temple name described him as the "literary emperor.".

Zhao's name was recorded as Zhao Hu in the Records of the Grand Historian by Sima Qian. The name of Zhao Mo did not arise until the discovery of two jade seals belonging to the emperor that bore the name of Zhao Mo but not Zhao Hu. "Zhao Hu" may have been an error made by Sima Qian when he was writing his Records. There is also a theory that Zhao Mo and Zhao Hu were two separate rulers, and that Zhao Mo's reign was excluded from historical records because of its brief duration.

Life

Upon Zhao Mo's accession in 137 BC, the neighboring king of Minyue, Zou Ying sent his army to attack Nanyue. Zhao sent for help from the Han dynasty, his nominal vassal overlord. The Han responded by sending troops against Minyue, but before they could get there, Zou Ying was killed by his brother Zou Yushan, who surrendered to the Han. The Han army was recalled.

Zhao considered visiting the Han court in order to show his gratitude. His high ministers argued against it, reminding him that his father kept his distance from the Han and merely avoided a breach of etiquette to keep the peace. Zhao therefore pleaded illness and never went through with the trip. Zhao did actually fall ill several years later and died in 124 BC. He was succeeded by his son, Zhao Yingqi.

Tomb

The tomb of Wen was discovered in 1983,  under Elephant Hill in Guangzhou on a construction site for a hotel, and has been excavated. It is divided in seven parts, with a front chamber, east and west wing rooms, the main coffin chamber, east and west side rooms, and a back storage chamber. The tomb has yielded more than 1000 burial artifacts, and a chariot, gold and silver vessels, musical instruments, and human sacrifices were found (15 courtiers were buried alive with him to serve him in death). It is also the only tomb of the early Western Han dynasty that has murals on its walls.

The tomb also yielded the oldest imperial seal discovered in a Chinese tomb: the seal, with the name "Zhao Mo", declared the royal corpse to be "Emperor Wen", indicating that he considered himself equal in rank to the Han ruler.

Alongside Chinese artifacts, pieces from the steppes, and Iranian and Hellenistic Central Asian regions have been found.  A Persian silver box found in the tomb is the earliest imported product found to date in China. There were also artifacts found which belonged to the Đông Sơn culture of northern Vietnam.

The Museum of the Mausoleum of the Nanyue King, located in Jiefang road in Guangzhou, stands on the site of the tomb of Zhao Mo.

Bibliography

See also
 Nanyue, Baiyue, and Minyue
 Panyu
 Zhao Tuo and his dynasty
 Museum of the Mausoleum of the Nanyue King
 Zhao Zhongshi
 Đông Sơn culture

References

External links 
 The Nanyue King's Tomb slideshow
 Museum of the Nanyue King Mausoleum

124 BC deaths
Vietnamese kings
Year of birth unknown
Nanyue
2nd-century BC Chinese monarchs

fr:Dynastie des Yue du Sud#Le mausolée du roi Zhao Mo